The canton of Reillanne is an administrative division in southeastern France. At the French canton reorganisation which came into effect in March 2015, the canton was expanded from 8 to 21 communes:
 
Aubenas-les-Alpes
Banon
Céreste
Dauphin
L'Hospitalet
Mane
Montjustin
Montsalier
Oppedette
Redortiers
Reillanne
Revest-des-Brousses
Revest-du-Bion
La Rochegiron
Sainte-Croix-à-Lauze
Saint-Maime
Saint-Michel-l'Observatoire
Saumane
Simiane-la-Rotonde
Vachères
Villemus

Demographics

See also
Cantons of the Alpes-de-Haute-Provence department 
Communes of France

References

Cantons of Alpes-de-Haute-Provence